Claude George Bowes-Lyon, 14th and 1st Earl of Strathmore and Kinghorne,  (14 March 1855 – 7 November 1944), styled as Lord Glamis from 1865 to  1904, was a British peer and landowner who was the father of Queen Elizabeth The Queen Mother and the maternal grandfather of Queen Elizabeth II.

Life and family
The Earl was born in Lowndes Square, London, the son of Claude Bowes-Lyon, 13th Earl of Strathmore and Kinghorne, and his wife, the former Frances Smith. His younger brother Patrick Bowes-Lyon was a tennis player who won the 1887 Wimbledon doubles.

After being educated at Eton College, the Earl received a commission in the 2nd Life Guards in 1876 and served for six years until the year after his marriage. He was an active member of the Territorial Army and served as honorary colonel of the 4th/5th Battalion of the Black Watch.

Upon succeeding his father to the Earldom on 16 February 1904, he inherited large estates in Scotland and England, including Glamis Castle, St Paul's Walden Bury, Gibside Hall and Streatlam Castle in County Durham and Woolmers Park, near Hertford. He was made Lord Lieutenant of Angus, an office he resigned when his daughter became queen. He had a keen interest in forestry and was one of the first to grow larch from seed in Britain. His estates had a large number of smallholders, and he had a reputation for being unusually kind to his tenants. His contemporaries described him as an unpretentious man, often seen in "an old macintosh tied with a piece of twine". He worked his own land and enjoyed physical labour on the grounds of his estates; visitors often mistook him for a common labourer. He made his own cocoa for breakfast, and always had a jug of water by his place at dinner so he could dilute his own wine.

Despite the Earl's reservations about royalty, in 1923 his youngest daughter, Elizabeth, married Prince Albert, Duke of York, the second son of King George V and Queen Mary. Lord Strathmore was made a Knight Grand Cross of the Royal Victorian Order to mark the marriage. His grand-daughter Princess Elizabeth (later Queen Elizabeth II) was born at his home, 17 Bruton Street, Mayfair, in 1926.

In 1928 he was made a Knight of the Thistle.

In 1936, his son-in-law became king and assumed the name George VI. As the father of the new queen, he was created a Knight of the Garter and the 1st Earl of Strathmore and Kinghorne, a United Kingdom peerage in the Coronation Honours of 1937 (although he was the 14th Earl of Strathmore and Kinghorne which was a Scottish title). This enabled him to sit in the House of Lords as an earl (because members of the peerage of Scotland did not automatically sit in the House of Lords, he had previously sat only as a baron through the Barony of Bowes created for his father). At the coronation of his daughter and son-in-law, the Earl and Countess sat in the royal box with Queen Mary and their shared granddaughters, Princesses Elizabeth and Margaret.

Later in life the Earl became extremely deaf. Lord Strathmore died of bronchitis on 7 November 1944, aged 89, at Glamis Castle. (Lady Strathmore had died in 1938.) He was succeeded by his son Patrick Bowes-Lyon, Lord Glamis.

Marriage and issue
He married Cecilia Cavendish-Bentinck on 16 July 1881 in Petersham, Surrey. The couple had ten children. The Earl would part his moustache in a theatrical but courteous gesture before kissing them:

Ancestry

Arms

Notes

Footnotes

References
Forbes, Grania, My Darling Buffy: The Early Life of The Queen Mother (Headline Book Publishing, 1999) 
Vickers, Hugo, Elizabeth: The Queen Mother (Arrow Books/Random House, 2006)

External links

1855 births
1944 deaths
Claude Bowes-Lyon, 14th Earl of Strathmore and Kinghorne
British Life Guards officers
Deaths from bronchitis
Deputy Lieutenants of Dundee
14
Knights Grand Cross of the Royal Victorian Order
Knights of the Garter
Knights of the Order of St John
Knights of the Thistle
Lord-Lieutenants of Angus
People educated at Eton College
Earls created by George VI